Celebrity is a condition of fame and broad public recognition of a person or group as a result of the attention given to them by mass media. An individual may attain a celebrity status from having great wealth, their participation in sports or the entertainment industry, their position as a political figure, or even from their connection to another celebrity. 'Celebrity' usually implies a favorable public image, as opposed to the neutrals 'famous' or 'notable', or the negatives 'infamous' and 'notorious'.

History
In his 2020 book Dead Famous: an unexpected history of celebrity, British historian Greg Jenner uses the definition:

Although his book is subtitled "from Bronze Age to Silver Screen", and despite the fact that "Until very recently, sociologists argued that celebrity was invented just over 100 years ago, in the flickering glimmer of early Hollywood" and the suggestion that some medieval saints might qualify, Jenner asserts that the earliest celebrities lived in the early 1700s, his first example being Henry Sacheverell.

Athletes in Ancient Greece were welcomed home as heroes, had songs and poems written in their honor, and received free food and gifts from those seeking celebrity endorsement. Ancient Rome similarly lauded actors and notorious gladiators, and Julius Caesar appeared on a coin in his own lifetime (a departure from the usual depiction of battles and divine lineage).

In the early 12th century, Thomas Becket became famous following his murder. He was promoted by the Christian Church as a martyr and images of him and scenes from his life became widespread in just a few years. In a pattern often repeated, what started as an explosion of popularity (often referred to with the suffix 'mania') turned into long-lasting fame: pilgrimages to Canterbury Cathedral where he was killed became instantly fashionable and the fascination with his life and death have inspired plays and films.

The cult of personality (particularly in the west) can be traced back to the Romantics in the 18th century, whose livelihood as artists and poets depended on the currency of their reputation. The establishment of cultural hot-spots became an important factor in the process of generating fame: for example, London and Paris in the 18th and 19th centuries. Newspapers started including gossip columns  and certain clubs and events became places to be seen in order to receive publicity. David Lodge called Charles Dickens the "first writer … to feel the intense pressure of being simultaneously an artist and an object of unrelenting public interest and adulation", and Juliet John backed up the claim for Dickens "to be called the first self-made global media star of the age of mass culture."

Theatrical actors were often celebrities. Restaurants near theaters, where actors would congregate, began putting up caricatures or photographs of actors on celebrity walls in the late 19th century. The subject of widespread public and media interest, Lillie Langtry made her debut in West End theatre in 1881 causing a sensation in London by becoming the first socialite to appear on stage. The following year she became the poster-girl for Pears Soap, becoming the first celebrity to endorse a commercial product. In 1895, poet and playwright Oscar Wilde became the subject of "one of the first celebrity trials".

The movie industry spread around the globe in the first half of the 20th century and now, the familiar concept of the instantly recognizable faces of its superstars. Yet, celebrity was not always tied to actors in films, especially when cinema was starting as a medium. As Paul McDonald states in The Star System: Hollywood's Production of Popular Identities, "in the first decade of the twentieth century, American film production companies withheld the names of film performers, despite requests from audiences, fearing that public recognition would drive performers to demand higher salaries."  Public fascination went well beyond the on-screen exploits of movie stars and their private lives became headline news: for example, in Hollywood the marriages of Elizabeth Taylor and in Bollywood the affairs of Raj Kapoor in the 1950s. Like theatrical actors before them, movie actors were the subjects of celebrity walls in restaurants they frequented, near movie studios, most notably at Sardi's in Hollywood.

The second half of the century saw television and popular music bring new forms of celebrity, such as the rock star and the pop group, epitomised by Elvis Presley and the Beatles, respectively. John Lennon's highly controversial 1966 quote: "We're more popular than Jesus now," which he later insisted was not a boast, and that he was not in any way comparing himself with Christ, gives an insight into both the adulation and notoriety that fame can bring. Unlike movies, television created celebrities who were not primarily actors; for example, presenters, talk show hosts, and newsreaders. However, most of these are only famous within the regions reached by their particular broadcaster, and only a few such as Oprah Winfrey, Jerry Springer, or David Frost could be said to have broken through into wider stardom.

In the '60s and early '70s, the book publishing industry began to persuade major celebrities to put their names on autobiographies and other titles in a genre called celebrity publishing. In most cases, the book was not written by the celebrity but by a ghostwriter, but the celebrity would then be available for a book tour and appearances on talk shows.

Wealth

Forbes Celebrity 100

Forbes Magazine releases an annual Forbes Celebrity 100 list of the highest-paid celebrities in the world. The total earnings for all top celebrity 100 earners totaled $4.5 billion in 2010 alone.

For instance, Forbes ranked media mogul and talk show host, Oprah Winfrey as the top earner "Forbes magazine’s annual ranking of the most powerful celebrities", with earnings of $290 million in the past year. Forbes cites that Lady Gaga reportedly earned over $90 million in 2010. In 2011, golfer Tiger Woods was one of highest-earning celebrity athletes, with an income of $74 million and is consistently ranked one of the highest-paid athletes in the world. In 2013, Madonna was ranked as the fifth most powerful and the highest-earning celebrity of the year with earnings of $125 million. She has consistently been among the most powerful and highest-earning celebrities in the world, occupying the third place in Forbes Celebrity 100 2009 with $110 million of earnings, and getting the tenth place in the 2011 edition of the list with annual earnings equal to $58 million. Beyoncé has also appeared in the top ten in 2008, 2009, 2010, 2013, 2017, and topped the list in 2014 with earnings of $115 million.

Entrepreneurship and endorsements

Celebrity endorsements have proven very successful around the world where, due to increasing consumerism, a person owns a  status symbol by purchasing a celebrity-endorsed product. Although it has become commonplace for celebrities to place their name with endorsements onto products just for quick money, some celebrities have gone beyond merely using their names and have put their entrepreneurial spirit to work by becoming entrepreneurs by attaching themselves in the business aspects of entertainment and building their own business brand beyond their traditional salaried activities. Along with investing their salaried wages into growing business endeavors, several celebrities have become innovative business leaders in their respective industries, gaining the admiration of their peers and contributing to the country's economy.

Numerous celebrities have ventured into becoming business moguls and established themselves as entrepreneurs, idolizing many well known American business leaders such as Bill Gates and Warren Buffett. For instance, basketball legend Michael Jordan became an active entrepreneur involved with many sports-related ventures including investing a minority stake in the Charlotte Bobcats, Paul Newman started his own salad dressing business after leaving behind a distinguished acting career, and rap musician Birdman started his own record label, clothing line, and an oil business while maintaining a career as a rap artist. Brazilian football legend and World Cup winner Ronaldo became the majority owner of La Liga club Real Valladolid in 2018. Other celebrities such as Tyler Perry, George Lucas, and Steven Spielberg have become successful entrepreneurs through starting their own film production companies and running their own movie studios beyond their traditional activities of screenwriting, directing, animating, producing, and acting.

Various examples of celebrity turned entrepreneurs included in the table below are:

Tabloid magazines and talk TV shows bestow a great deal of attention to celebrities. To stay in the public eye and build wealth in addition to their salaried labor, numerous celebrities have participating and branching into various business ventures and endorsements. Many celebrities have participated in many different endorsement opportunities that include: animation, publishing, fashion designing, cosmetics, consumer electronics, household items and appliances, cigarettes, soft drinks and alcoholic beverages, hair care, hairdressing, jewelry design, fast food, credit cards, video games, writing, and toys.

In addition to various endorsements, some celebrities have been involved with some business and investment-related ventures also include:  and toddler related items, sports team ownership, fashion retailing, establishments such as restaurants, cafes, hotels, and casinos, movie theaters, advertising and event planning, management-related ventures such as sports management, financial services, model management, and talent management, record labels, film production, television production, publishing such as book and music publishing, massage therapy, salons, health and fitness, and real estate.

Although some celebrities have achieved additional financial success from various business ventures, the vast majority of celebrities are not successful businesspeople and still rely on salaried labored wages to earn a living. Most businesses and investments are well known to have a 90 to 95 percent failure rate within the first five years of operation. Not all celebrities eventually succeed with their businesses and other related side ventures. Some celebrities either went broke or filed for bankruptcy as a result of dabbling with such side businesses or endorsements. Though some might question such validity since celebrities themselves are already well known, have mass appeal, and are well exposed to the general public. The average entrepreneur who is not well known and reputable to the general public does not the same marketing flexibility and status-quo as most celebrities allow and have. Therefore, compared to the average person who starts a business, celebrities already have all the cards and odds stacked in their favor. This means they can have an unfair advantage to expose their business ventures and endorsements and can easily capture a more significant amount of market share than the average entrepreneur.

Mass media phenomena

Celebrities often have fame comparable to royalty. As a result, there is a strong public curiosity about their private affairs. The release of Kim Kardashian's sex tape with rapper Ray J in 2003 brought her to a new level of fame, leading to magazine covers, book deals, and reality TV series.

Celebrities may be resented for their accolades, and the public may have a love/hate relationship with celebrities. Due to the high visibility of celebrities' private lives, their successes and shortcomings are often made very public. Celebrities are alternately portrayed as glowing examples of perfection, when they garner awards, or as decadent or immoral if they become associated with a scandal. When seen in a positive light, celebrities are frequently portrayed as possessing skills and abilities beyond average people; for example, celebrity actors are routinely celebrated for acquiring new skills necessary for filming a role within a very brief time, and to a level that amazes the professionals who train them. Similarly, some celebrities with very little formal education can sometimes be portrayed as experts on complicated issues. Some celebrities have been very vocal about their political views. For example, Matt Damon expressed his displeasure with 2008 US vice presidential nominee Sarah Palin, as well as with the 2011 United States debt-ceiling crisis.

Famous for being famous

Famous for being famous, in popular culture terminology, refers to someone who attains celebrity status for no particular identifiable reason, or who achieves fame through association with a celebrity.  The term is a pejorative, suggesting the target has no particular talents or abilities. Even when their fame arises from a particular talent or action on their part, the term will sometimes still apply if their fame is perceived as disproportionate to what they earned through their own talent or work.

The coinages "famesque" and "celebutante" are of similar pejorative gist.

Internet
Also known as being internet famous.

Asia
A report by the BBC highlighted a longtime trend of Asian internet celebrities such as Chinese celebrity Wang Hong (birth name Ling Ling). According to the BBC, there are two kinds of online celebrities in China—those who create original content, such as Papi Jiang, who is regularly censored by Chinese authorities for cursing in her videos, and those such as Wang Hong and Zhang Dayi, who fall under the second category, as they have clothing and cosmetics businesses on Taobao, China's equivalent of Amazon.

Social networking and video hosting
Most high-profile celebrities participate in social networking services and photo or video hosting platforms such as YouTube, Twitter, Facebook, Instagram, and Snapchat. Social networking services allow celebrities to communicate directly with their fans, removing the middle-man known as traditional media.Through social media many persons outside entertainment and sports sphere become celebrity in their own sphere. Social media humanizes celebrities in a way that arouses public fascination as evident by the success of magazines such as Us Weekly and People Weekly. Celebrity blogging have also spawned stars such as Perez Hilton who is well known for not only blogging but also outing celebrities.

Social media and the rise of the smartphone have changed how celebrities are treated and how people gain the platform of fame. Not everything is as concealed as it was back in old Hollywood because now everything is put out on the internet by fans or even the celebrity themselves. Websites like Twitter, Facebook, Instagram, and YouTube allow people to become a celebrity overnight. For example, Justin Bieber got his start on YouTube by posting videos of him singing and got discovered. All of his fans got direct contact with his content and were able to interact with him on several social media platforms. Social media has substantially changed what it means to be a celebrity. Instagram and YouTube allow regular people to become rich and famous all from inside their home. It also allows fans to connect with their favorite celebrity without ever meeting them in person. Everything is being shared on social media so it makes it harder for celebrities to live private lives.

Social media sites have also contributed to the fame of some celebrities, such as Tila Tequila who became known through MySpace.

Access restriction
Access to celebrities is strictly controlled by their entourage of staff which includes managers, publicists, agents, personal assistants, and bodyguards. Even journalists find it difficult to access celebrities for interviews.  Writer and actor Michael Musto said, "You have to go through many hoops just to talk to a major celebrity. You have to get past three different sets of publicists: the publicist for the event, the publicist for the movie, and then the celebrity's personal publicist. They all have to approve you."

Celebrities also typically have security staff at their home, to protect them from similar threats.

Fifteen minutes of fame

"15 minutes of fame" is a phrase often used in reference to short-lived publicity, and mistakenly attributed to Andy Warhol. Certain "15 minutes of fame" celebrities can be average people seen with an A-list celebrity, who are sometimes noticed on entertainment news channels such as E! News. These persons are ordinary people becoming celebrities, often based on the ridiculous things they do.  "In fact, many reality show contestants fall into this category: the only thing that qualifies them to be on TV is that they're real."

Health implications
Common threats such as stalking have spawned celebrity worship syndrome where a person becomes overly involved with the details of a celebrity's personal life.    Psychologists have indicated that though many people obsess over glamorous film, television, sport and music stars, the disparity in salaries in society seems to value professional athletes and entertainment industry-based professionals. One study found that singers, musicians, actors and athletes die younger on average than writers, composers, academics, politicians and businesspeople, with a greater incidence of cancer and especially lung cancer. However, it was remarked that the reasons for this remained unclear, with theories including innate tendencies towards risk-taking as well as the pressure or opportunities of particular types of fame.

Fame might have negative psychological effects, and may lead to increasingly selfish tendencies and psychopathy. An academic study on the subject said that fame has an addictive quality to it.  When a celebrity's fame recedes over time, the celebrity may find it difficult to adjust psychologically.

Recently, there has been more attention toward the impact celebrities have on health decisions of the population at large. It is believed that the public will follow celebrities' health advice to some extent. This can have positive impacts when the celebrities give solid, evidence-informed health advice, however, it can also have detrimental effects if the health advice is not accurate enough.

See also

Citations

General and cited references 
 Goldman, Jonathan (2011) Modernism Is the Literature of Celebrity. Austin: University of Texas Press, 2011. 
 Grinin, Leonid (2009) "'People of Celebrity' as a New Social Stratum and Elite". In Hierarchy and Power in the History of Civilizations: Cultural Dimensions (pp. 183–206). Ed. by Leonid E. Grinin and Andrey V. Korotayev. Moscow: KRASAND/Editorial URSS, 2009.
 
 Schikel, Richard. Intimate Strangers: The Culture of Celebrity. New York: Doubleday, 1985. .

Further reading

External links